Sphetta apicalis is a moth of the family Notodontidae first described by Francis Walker in 1865. It is found in Sri Lanka.

Host plants of the caterpillar include Pongamia, Derris, Sapindus, Diospyros and Nephelium species.

References

Moths of Asia
Moths described in 1865
Notodontidae